Orthotylus obscurus is a species of bug in the Miridae family that is can be found in Austria, Bulgaria, Croatia, France, Germany, Italy, Romania, Switzerland, Sweden, and European part of Turkey.

References

Insects described in 1875
Hemiptera of Europe
obscurus